14th Brigade or 14th Infantry Brigade may refer to:

United Kingdom
 14th Airlanding Brigade (United Kingdom)
 14th Infantry Brigade (United Kingdom)
 14th Mounted Brigade (United Kingdom)
 Artillery Brigades
 14th Brigade Royal Field Artillery, a unit of the British Expeditionary Force of 1914
 XIV Brigade, Royal Horse Artillery

Ukraine
 14th Separate Mechanized Brigade (Ukraine)
 14th Tank Brigade (Ukraine)

Other countries
 14th Brigade (Australia)
 14th Brigade (Japan)
 14th Brigade (New Zealand)
 14th Cavalry Brigade (British Indian Army)
 XIV International Brigade

See also
 14th Regiment (disambiguation)
 14th Division (disambiguation)